Yellowjacket Pass is a  elevation mountain pass in Archuleta County, Colorado in the United States.

See also
Colorado mountain passes

References

Mountain passes of Colorado
Landforms of Archuleta County, Colorado